Under röd flagg (Swedish for 'Under red flag') was a weekly magazine published in Sweden in 1891 by Hinke Bergegren. Bergegren acted as the editor and publisher of the magazine. Nine issues were published from March to June 1891. Under röd flagg sought to bring together writers from the political peripheries of the Social-Democratic Party. Articles in the publication contained Marxist, anarchist and anarchist communist ideas. Under röd flagg was the first periodical to introduce a detailed account of anarchist thought in Sweden, for example through texts of Peter Kropotkin, Leo Tolstoy, Élisée Reclus and Swedish anarchists.

The majority of articles in Under röd flagg were signed by pseudonyms, a fact that was sharply criticized at the time.

Under röd flagg appeared in a period when the issue of tactics was a major theme of discussion within the Social-Democratic Party. The publication was characterized by frequent and radical criticisms against parliamentarism, criticisms directed towards the party leadership. The idea of a general strike as a revolutionary weapon was a concurring theme in the articles of the publication.

The first issue of Under röd flagg was published on March 15, 1891. It contained a largely programmatic article, titled Förbannelsens treenighet, privat äganderätt, religionen, äktenskapet ('The cursed trinity; private ownership, religion, marriage'). The 'cursed trinity' was said to represent the foundations of capitalism. On March 17, 1891 Social-Democratic stalwart Hjalmar Branting wrote a sarcastic rebuttal to the article in Social-Demokraten. Branting stated that Bergegren had positioned himself beyond the limits of the Social-Democratic Party. Axel Danielsson also denounced the new publication.

Under röd flagg was closed down as Bergegren moved on to become the editor of Proletären ('The Proletarian').

See also
List of anarchist periodicals

References

External links
Under röd flagg archive at Marxist Internet Archive

1891 establishments in Sweden
1891 disestablishments in Sweden
Anarcho-communism
Anarchist periodicals
Anarchism in Sweden
Communist magazines
Communist propaganda
Defunct magazines published in Sweden
Defunct political magazines
Magazines established in 1891
Magazines disestablished in 1891
Marxist magazines
Political magazines published in Sweden
Swedish-language magazines
Weekly magazines published in Sweden